The 1967 Cal State Los Angeles Diablos football team represented California State College at Los Angeles—now known as California State University, Los Angeles—as a member of the California Collegiate Athletic Association (CCAA) during the 1967 NCAA College Division football season. Led by second-year head coach Jim Williams, Cal State Los Angeles compiled an overall record of 1–9 with a mark of 0–5 in conference play, placing last out of six teams in the CCAA. The Diablos played home games at the Rose Bowl in Pasadena, California.

Schedule

References

Cal State Los Angeles
Cal State Los Angeles Diablos football seasons
Cal State Los Angeles Diablos football